18th Street, also known as , , , or simply  in Central America, is a multi-ethnic (largely Central American and Mexican) transnational criminal organization that started as a street gang in Los Angeles. It is one of the largest transnational criminal gangs in Los Angeles, with 65,000 members between the United States, Mexico, and Central America and is also allied with the Mexican Mafia, another US-based crime organization. A United States Department of Justice report featured the following statement regarding 18th Street and rival gang MS-13, "These two gangs have turned the Central American northern triangle into the area with the highest homicide rate in the world."

History 
18th Street gang started near 18th Street and Union Avenue in the Rampart District of Los Angeles. There is conflicting information as to the exact area, but this is a generally accepted area by most academic sources. They were originally part of Clanton 14 but wanted to make a separate "clique" called Clanton 18th Street and allow immigrants the opportunity to join. This proposal was rejected by the Clanton 14, which led to the formation of the 18th Street gang. The two gangs have been bitter rivals ever since.

The 18th Street gang grew by expanding its membership to other nationalities and races, and it was among the first multiracial, multi-ethnic gangs in Los Angeles. In the beginning, they were made up largely of second-generation Hispanics. As the 18th Street gang began to battle with more established Hispanic gangs, they began to recruit outside the Hispanic community. There are approximately 200 separate individual autonomous gangs operating under the same name within separate barrios in the San Fernando Valley specifically in North Hollywood, the San Gabriel Valley, South Bay, Riverside, East Los Angeles, South Los Angeles, Hollywood, Downtown Los Angeles, Northeast Los Angeles, Pico Union, Westlake, Koreatown, Inglewood, South Gate, Huntington Park, Maywood, Long Beach, Orange County, San Bernardino County, Tucson Arizona and Los Angeles' Westside or West LA, according to the latest figures from the NDIC. In the early 2000s, the Federal Bureau of Investigation initiated wide-scale raids against known and suspected gang members, netting hundreds of arrests across the country.

Central America
Eighteen Street started as a Mexican-American gang, but 18th Street also became Central American as it started to recruit more members of other ethnic groups. When Central American gang members were arrested in the United States, they were then deported back to Central America where the gang rose out-of-control on different levels of violence not just in El Salvador, but in Honduras and Guatemala as well, becoming one of the most violent gangs in Central America. 18th Street later became a bitter rival of MS-13 as both gangs wanted the top spot in Central America. Members of 18th street are mainly Salvadoran, Guatemalan, and Honduran, but the gang does have members from other parts of Central America. 18th Street influences have recently been spotted in Belize as well.

In El Salvador a faction called the "Revolucionarios" ("Revolutionaries") split off 18th Street in 2005, becoming rivals with the other members, who came to be known as the "Sureños" ("Southerners.")

Location 
The majority of 18th Street cliques operate throughout Southern California, but are active in other states and internationally as well. Los Angeles members began migrating to other areas outside Spain and started to establish their own gangs. 18th Street gangs have been identified in 120 cities in 37 states and the District of Columbia in the United States, as well internationally reported in Australia, Canada, England, France, Germany, Lebanon, Peru, Mexico, Guatemala, Honduras, El Salvador, and Venezuela.

Organization
The organization of the 18th Street Gang differs from location to location. With the gang being spread so vastly nationally and internationally, it is difficult to have a universal organizational structure. The gang is organized in such a way that allows for leadership at every level. One common organizational structure seen used by Barrio 18 is as follows. At the very top are “palabreros” or “leaders,” a majority of these members are in prison, but still help run the gang by coordinating all criminal activities. “Palabreros” also exist outside of the prison and are known as “en la libre.” Lastly, there are civilians who are known as collaborators. They are not officially gang members, but they are responsible for helping the gang with small jobs, like obtaining intelligence, and moving or holding illicit goods. The 18th Street Gang also designates positions in their organizational structure in another way. In this structure, at the top are the leaders, known as “toros,” meaning bull. Underneath each “toro” is a clica, which is led by a “homie.” Under each “homie” are the “soldados,” meaning soldiers. Outside of the prisons, Barrio 18 is organized into divisions based on territory called “canchas.” The gang is horizontal in structure, allowing for a more decentralized approach to things. Although, overall 18th Street Gang is not very organized compared to some other modern day gangs. 
Women were also able to join the gang, but were treated very poorly. The women that joined the gang had three ways to do so, first was an 18 second beating, second was sexual intercourse with multiple members, and the last option was being the girlfriend or wife of a member can potentially lead to membership over time. The women were expected to take on male-associated roles often involving violence, as well as playing more of a mother role by caring for children and taking care of the sick.

Culture 
18th Street gang members are required to abide by a strict set of rules.  Failure to obey the word of a gang leader, or to show proper respect to a fellow gang member, may result in an 18-second beating, or even execution for more serious offenses. According to the FBI, some factions of the 18th Street gang have developed a high level of sophistication and organization. 18th Street gang members often identify themselves with the number 18 on their clothing and sporting clothing from sports teams such as the Duke Blue Devils, Los Angeles Clippers, Los Angeles Angels, Los Angeles Chargers, Los Angeles Dodgers, Los Angeles Lakers,  LAFC, and Las Vegas Raiders.  18th Street will use the symbols XV3, XVIII, X8, 666, 99, and 3-dots in their graffiti and tattoos. 18th Street colors are blue and black; blue is to represent and to pay tribute to The Mexican Mafia, and black is to represent the original color for the gang. The 18th Street gang is occasionally referred to as the "Children's Army" because of its recruitment of elementary and middle-school aged youth. They also allow other ethnicities to join their ranks making the gang multi-ethnic. In El Salvador it is common for members of the gang to be tattooed on the face with a large "18". In many cases the tattoo covers the entire face.

Criminal activity 
"We recognize them as one of the most violent street gangs and one of the most prolific in the United States," says Special agent George Rodriguez, who until his retirement oversaw investigations for the federal Bureau of Alcohol, Tobacco, Firearms and Explosives. Cars are stolen and homes are burgled by the gang routinely. On average, someone in Los Angeles County is assaulted or robbed by 18th Streeters every day. The gang has left a bloody trail at a pace three times that of many of the city's most active gangs. 18th Street is a well established gang that is involved in all areas of street-crime. Several 18th Street gang members have reached a higher level of sophistication and organization in their illicit activities than other gangs. While their main source of income is street-level distribution of drugs, they also have been linked to murders, assaults, arson, copyright infringement, extortion, human trafficking, illegal immigration, kidnapping, prostitution, robbery, and weapons trafficking, as well as other crimes. 18th Street Gang has also been implicated in the high-profile kidnapping and murder of the 16-year-old brother of internationally renowned Honduran football player Wilson Palacios.

In 1998, Catarino Gonzalez was sentenced to life in prison after a jury convicted Gonzalez of first-degree murder for fatally shooting Officer Filbert Cuesta in the back of the head, while the officer was sitting in a patrol car.

Kingston, New York police arrested and jailed several young men on the charge that they abducted a victim, took him to nearby woods, and murdered him. They were held on federal murder and racketeering charges.

In 2019, an 18th Street gangster was fatally shot by a member of rival gang MS-13 in a Queens subway station.

In Guatemala City, many bus drivers have been killed by 18th Street gang members that drove through the alleged territory of the gang. Bus drivers were often victims of robberies and extortion. In one particular case the bus owners refused to pay the gang; a few moments later, a young man, the son of one of Libertad's bus owners was driving his bus along Route 4, which ran from the terminal down to the Universidad de San Carlos de Guatemala in the southern part of the city. As he passed through Zone 6, two men flagged down the bus. They boarded it without paying and shot the driver in the head killing him instantly.

See also 
 Transnational gangs
 Criminal tattoo

References

Further reading

External links 

MS-13 Member's Trail Shows Gang's Movement 18th Street Gang/MS-13 Rivalry

La Cloaca Internacional: Entrevista de dos horas a integrantes del Barrio 18 (in Spanish)
FBI.gov
ICE.gov

Organizations established in the 1960s
1960s establishments in California
Sureños
Latino street gangs
Transnational organized crime
Gangs in Los Angeles
Gangs in El Salvador
Gangs in Guatemala
Gangs in Honduras
Guatemalan-American culture
Honduran-American culture
Mexican-American culture in Los Angeles
Salvadoran-American culture in California